An ice age is a long period of reduction in the temperature of the Earth's surface and atmosphere.

Ice Age may also refer to:

Science
 Last Glacial Period, the most recent glacial period (115,000 to 11,700 years ago)
 Late Cenozoic Ice Age, the geologic period of the last 33.9 million years
 Little Ice Age, a period of relative cold in certain regions from roughly 1450–1480
 Pleistocene, a geologic epoch, often colloquially referred to as the "Ice Age", that includes the world's most recent repeated glaciations (2,580,000 to 11,700 years ago)
 Plio-Pleistocene, a geological pseudo-period
 Quaternary glaciation, the geologic period of the last 2.58 million years

Film and television
 Ice Age (franchise), an American media franchise
 Ice Age (2002 film), the first film in the franchise
 Ice Age: The Meltdown, a 2006 sequel
 Ice Age: Dawn of the Dinosaurs, a 2009 sequel
 Ice Age: A Mammoth Christmas, a 2011 TV special
 Ice Age: Continental Drift, a 2012 sequel
 Ice Age: The Great Egg-Scapade, a 2016 TV special
 Ice Age: Collision Course, a 2016 sequel
 The Ice Age Adventures of Buck Wild, a 2022 spin-off.
 Ice Age: Scrat Tales, a 2022 spinoff series

 Ice Age (1975 film), a West German drama film

Music
 Ice Age (band), an American progressive metal band formed in the 1990s
 Iceage, a Danish punk rock band formed in 2008
 Ice Age Entertainment, an American record label
 Ice Ages (band), an Austrian dark electro music project
 "Ice Age" (song), by How to Destroy Angels, 2012
 "Ice Age", a song by Band of Susans from The Word and the Flesh, 1991
 "Ice Age", a song by Jefferson Airplane from Jefferson Airplane, 1989
 "Ice Age", a song by Joy Division from Still, 1981

Other uses
 Ice Age (Magic: The Gathering), a block of sets for the collectible card game
 Ice Age (video game), the name of several video games
 The Ice Age (novel), by Margaret Drabble, 1977

See also

 Global cooling